Adenochilus gracilis is a plant in the orchid family Orchidaceae and is endemic to New Zealand. It has a long, thin underground rhizome, a single leaf on the flowering stem and a single white flower with glandular hairs on the outside. Its labellum has red to maroon bars and a central band of yellow calli, but is almost obscured by the dorsal sepal.

Description
Adenochilus gracilis is a terrestrial, perennial, deciduous, herb with a long, thin, horizontal rhizome. There is a similar leaf about halfway up the flowering stem, but lacking a petiole. The outer surface of the sepals and petals is covered with short glandular hairs. The dorsal sepal is lance-shaped and forms a hood over the labellum and column, almost obscuring them. The lateral sepals spread widely apart from each other, and the petals are similar to the sepals. The labellum curves downwards and has three lobes, the central lobe narrower than the others, and has red to maroon bars and two to four rows of yellow calli in a dense central band. Flowering occurs between October and March.

Taxonomy and naming
Adenochilus gracilis was first formally described in 1853 by Joseph Dalton Hooker and the description was published in Flora Novae-Zelandiae. The specific epithet (gracilis) is a Latin word meaning "slender.

Distribution and habitat

This orchid grows in thick layers of moss or partly decomposed leaf litter in scrub and forests. It is found on the North, South, Stewart and Chatham Islands.

References

gracilis
Plants described in 1853
Orchids of New Zealand
Taxa named by Joseph Dalton Hooker